William Clark Ward (February 19, 1921 – December 3, 1992) was an American football offensive guard in the National Football League (NFL) for the Washington Redskins and the Detroit Lions.  He attended the University of Washington and Washington State University.

He taught Traffic Safety for many years at Bellingham High School in Bellingham, Washington.

External links
 

1921 births
1992 deaths
Sportspeople from Washington (state)
American football offensive guards
Washington Huskies football players
Washington State Cougars football players
Washington Redskins players
Detroit Lions players
People from Sequim, Washington